Stenocarpus reticulatus, commonly known as black silky oak, is a species of flowering plant in the family Proteaceae and is endemic to north Queensland. It is a tree with simple leaves, groups of strongly-perfumed, creamy-white flowers and flattened, semi-circular follicles.

Description

Taxonomy
Stenocarpus reticulatus was first formally described in 1919 by Cyril Tenison White in the Botany Bulletin of the Queensland Department of Agriculture and Stock from specimens collected by H.W. Mocatta on the Atherton Tableland.

Distribution and habitat

References

Flora of Queensland
reticulatus
Plants described in 1919
Taxa named by Cyril Tenison White